The Pilgrim and the Stars is an album by Italian jazz trumpeter and composer Enrico Rava recorded in 1975 and released on the ECM label.

Reception
The Allmusic review by Matt Collar awarded the album 4 stars stating "Enrico Rava's debut for ECM, 1975's The Pilgrim and the Stars, is a stellar progressive jazz effort from the Italian trumpeter who was then just coming into his own... This is just the kind of contemplative and experimental Euro-jazz that ECM made its name on, but with some seriously cinematic post-bop guts. In that sense, The Pilgrim and the Stars sounds something akin to a soundtrack to a '70s neo-noir film -- albeit a deliciously avant-garde one".

Track listing
All compositions by Enrico Rava except as indicated
 "The Pilgrim and the Stars" - 9:45 
 "Parks" - 1:48 
 "Bella" - 9:20 
 "Pesce Naufrago" - 5:15 
 "Surprise Hotel" - 1:55 
 "By the Sea" (Enrico Rava, Graciela Rava) - 4:49 
 "Blancasnow" - 6:50 
Recorded at Tonstudio Bauer in Ludwigsburg, West Germany in June 1975

Personnel
Enrico Rava - trumpet
John Abercrombie - guitar
Palle Danielsson - bass
Jon Christensen - drums

References

ECM Records albums
Enrico Rava albums
1975 albums
Albums produced by Manfred Eicher